The 443d Fighter Squadron is an inactive United States Air Force unit. It was last assigned to the 327th Fighter Group, stationed at Norfolk Army Airfield, Virginia. It was inactivated on 10 April 1944.

The group was active with the First Air Force as an operational training and air defense unit, February 1943 – February 1944, later performing replacement pilot training, February–April 1944.

History

Lineage
 Constituted the 443d Fighter Squadron in February 1943
 Activated on 24 February 1943
 Disbanded on 10 April 1944.

Assignments
 327th Fighter Group, 24 February 1943 – 10 April 1944

Stations
 Richmond Army Airbase, Virginia, 24 February 1943
 Norfolk Army Airfield, Virginia, 16 February – 10 April 1944

Aircraft
 P-40 Warhawk, 1943
 P-47 Thunderbolt, 1943–1944

References

External links

Fighter squadrons of the United States Army Air Forces